Michael Tung (born 19 March 1990) is a Trinidad racing cyclist. He started swimming at the age of fifteen and made his first swimming national record a couple months after. He excelled in swimming, coming second in the 100M free at Marlins International Open and coming first overall in several High School Invitational competitions. From there he went into the sport of triathlon. Ranking first in triathlon in his country at the age of 16, Michael managed to be invited to compete in the 2006 ITU World Championships in Lausane, Switzerland.

Michael's passion for cycling made him pursue the sport on a higher level. He excelled immediately, as he was able to come second and third in the majority of races he participated in. In 2007, Michael was able to win the first Tour of Trinidad (a three-day race which covers an average 100 km per day) and was able to become the 2008 National Keirin Champion.

Career highlights

Sources
 http://autobus.cyclingnews.com/road.php?id=road/2006/sep06/tobago06
 http://www.newsday.co.tt/sport/0,83216.html
 http://www.newsday.co.tt/sport/0,66537.html
 http://www.newsday.co.tt/sport/0,95041.html
 http://www.newsday.co.tt/sport/0,79597.html
 http://guardian.co.tt/sports/other-sports/2009/02/01/2009-cycling-season-opens
 https://web.archive.org/web/20090129205347/http://ttcyclingfederation.com/
 http://www.ttcyclingfederation.com/results/2007-09-15-CriteriumChamps.htm
 http://www.odesseytiming.com/RESULTS07/07-10-04-Tobago-Cycling-Classic/res-stg2-div2.htm
 http://www.triathlon.org/?call=TVRFeQ==&id=Nzc2Mg==&keep=sh
 https://www.amazon.it/Trinidad-Tobago-Cyclists-Olympic-Michael/dp/images/1158673310

Living people
1990 births
Trinidad and Tobago male cyclists